James Stirling Ferguson (13 August 1896 – 21 September 1952) was a Scottish professional footballer who made over 220 appearances as a goalkeeper in the Football League for Notts County and Brentford.

Personal life 
Ferguson's younger brother, Alex, was also a goalkeeper.

Honours 
Notts County
Football League Third Division South: 1930–31

Career statistics

References

1896 births
Footballers from Airdrie, North Lanarkshire
Scottish footballers
English Football League players
Association football goalkeepers
Brentford F.C. players
Partick Thistle F.C. players
St Roch's F.C. players
Scottish Football League players
Notts County F.C. players
1952 deaths
Ayr United F.C. players